Ammatucha semiirrorella is a species of snout moth in the genus Ammatucha. It was described by George Hampson in 1896 and is known from south-east Asia (including Bhutan and Nagas), as well as Australia.

References

 , 2006, Review of Ammatucha Turner with descriptions of three new species Zootaxa 1131: 59-68.

Moths described in 1896
Phycitini
Moths of Asia
Moths of Australia